The 2007 Recopa Sudamericana (officially the 2007 Recopa Visa Sudamericana for sponsorship reasons) was the 15th Recopa Sudamericana, an annual football match between the winners of the previous season's Copa Libertadores and Copa Sudamericana competitions.

The match was contested by Internacional, winners of the 2006 Copa Libertadores, and Pachuca, winners of the 2006 Copa Sudamericana. Internacional defeated Pachuca 5–2 on aggregate and became new champions of the competition.

Qualified teams

Venues

Matches

First leg

Second leg

References

2007 in South American football
2007
2006–07 in Mexican football
2007 in Brazilian football
Sport Club Internacional matches
C.F. Pachuca matches